Sieng Kong or sometimes spell Xiang Gong and Siang Kong (pinyin: Xiān gōng) is a neighbourhood in the area of Bangkok's Chinatown, Talat Noi sub-district, Samphanthawong district. It is well known to most Thais as the car part and secondhand engine machine center. It covers the area from Talat Noi, Song Wat to parts of Khao Lam, Tri Mit and Charoen Krung roads.

Its name "Sieng Gong" came from a small joss house called Sieng Gong, which settle on Song Wat close to Charoen Krung roads and today's Odeon Circle. The old joss house was established in 1854 (corresponding to the 4th year of Xianfeng Emperor's reign of Qing dynasty) by a group of Hoklo which settle down around there. The current location, in the past it was an area adjacent to a canal before.

So, people often call this place as ‘Sieng Kong’.  Indeed in Chinese term (Teochew dialect), ‘Sieng’ (仙) means "god" or "xian" and ‘Gong’ (公) means "grandpa". The meaning have nothing to do with the auto part business anyway. However, Sieng Gong is the name of place which origin the quality secondhand auto-part and make other places use this name such as Sieng Kong Bang Na, Sieng Kong Chiang Mai, Sieng Kong Rangsit, Sieng Kong Nakhon Pathom etc.    

The history of this place began during the Second World War period. Chinese settlers gathered here to trade engine spare parts. After that, this business has continued to grow to this day.

Now, its official name Soi Wanit 2 (ซอยวานิช 2) in pair with Soi Wanit 1 or popularly known as Sampheng, a bustling shopping district nearby. It was promoted as part of Chinatown's walking street.

References

External links

 
Samphanthawong district
Neighbourhoods of Bangkok
Chinese-Thai culture